Ranunculus pygmaeus, the pygmy buttercup or dwarf buttercup, is a species of buttercup found throughout the Arctic, as well as in the mountains of Norway and the Rocky Mountains. A few populations also exist in the Eastern Alps and Tatra Mountains.

It is a small plant, prostrate-ascending, 1–5 cm tall. The stems are single-flowered, with the basal leaves numerous. The leaves are deeply cleft into 3-5 lobes. The flowers are 5–6 mm in diameter, with five pale yellow petals, and five hairy sepals. After flowering, the stems stretch considerably, reaching far above the basal leaves. It grows in snowbeds, moss carpets and other moist localities.

References

pygmaeus
Alpine flora
Flora of the Arctic
Flora of Europe
Flora of North America